Torrens University is an Australian international private, for-profit university and vocational registered training organisation, with campuses in Sydney, Melbourne, Brisbane, Adelaide, Gold Coast, Blue Mountains, Australia, Auckland, New Zealand, and Suzhou, China. It began teaching in its first campus in the Torrens Building in Adelaide city centre. As of 2022 the university has about 21,000 enrolled students. As a private higher education provider, Torrens University Australia is the only university in Australia and New Zealand, and one of four globally, to be a Certified B Corporation, meaning it meets high standards of verified performance, accountability, and transparency across five key impact areas: students, staff, community, governance, and the environment. 

Torrens University Australia, along with Think Education and Media Design School, together form Torrens Global Education, which is part of Strategic Education, Inc.

History

An application from Laureate Education Asia to found a private university was approved by the Government of South Australia in October 2011.  Upon commission, Torrens University became the 33rd university in Australia and the first new university for 20 years.

The go-ahead for the new university was given by the South Australian Cabinet following Premier Mike Rann's negotiations in Australia and in Cancun, Mexico, with Laureate Chairman Douglas Becker and Chancellor Michael Mann. Honorary Laureate Chancellor and former US President Bill Clinton publicly endorsed the Australian project.

The founding President and Vice-chancellor was Fred McDougall, former deputy vice-chancellor and vice-president of the University of Adelaide.

Torrens University Australia was accredited by the Tertiary Education Quality and Standards Agency in 2012. It was originally expected to open in 2013 but commenced teaching in 2014. In September 2019, Torrens University was reaccredited by TEQSA for 5 years until September 2024.  

In 2020 Strategic Education Inc. became the new owner of Torrens University Australia. This new alliance created a global network of over 100,000 learners around the world.

Campuses
, Torrens University has campuses in and around five cities in Australia, one in New Zealand and one in China. There are about 20,000 enrolled students.

Adelaide
Adelaide was the first location in the country, opening its first campus in the heritage-listed Torrens Building on Victoria Square/Tarndanyangga, in the CBD, in 2013.

On 3 August 2015 the university opened a new campus just along the road in the old Menz Biscuits factory on Wakefield Street, and  no longer lists Torrens Building as another campus. There is another campus in Adelaide on Pulteney Street. This campus is the Blue Mountains International Hotel Management School hub in the centre of Adelaide’s CBD, exclusively focused on students studying a Master of International Hotel Management.

Brisbane

There are two campuses in Brisbane,  : the Fortitude Valley campus, which is adjacent to the Storey Bridge and home to a range of courses and degrees in Design and Creative Technology, Health & Education, and Business & Hospitality, along with the Torrens University Language Centre; and the Gotha Street campus which delivers a range of Health courses and degrees.

Gold Coast

The Gold Coast campus is a large centrally located campus in Southport near other educational facilities and international recruitment agencies. Classes run in the afternoon and in the evening.

Melbourne

Melbourne plays host to a campus located on Melbourne's Flinders Street and The Practice Wellbeing Centre located in Fitzroy.

Sydney and Blue Mountains

There are three campuses in the Sydney region. These campuses include the Ultimo campus and Surry Hills, and the Blue Mountains campus on the outskirts of metropolitan Sydney. The Blue Mountains campus is located in the suburb of Leura, adjacent to Katoomba. The campus is home to Torrens University's Practical Learning Centre, simulated hotel environment where students learn hotel management as part of their practical development. The Ultimo campus is a home for the Design & Creative Technology students, while its newest campus, Surry Hills Campus, is home to students from all other faculties, as well as the Torrens University Language Centre, and just minutes away from Sydney’s Central Train Station.

Auckland, New Zealand
Media Design School is a state-of-the-art, purpose-built property in the heart of Auckland’s thriving Wynyard Quarter. Media Design School offers a range of courses in design and creative technology. As the only education provider with a presence in New Zealand’s Innovation Precinct, students learn in the epicentre of the tech industry, with exciting networking and collaboration opportunities right on the doorstep.

Suzhou, China 
This campus is home to BMIHMS at Torrens University Australia, operated as a joint venture with Suzhou Tourism and Finance Institute. This campus is in close proximity to Shanghai, and offers training in restaurant service, front office management, guest relations and housekeeping.

Organisation and academics

Schools
 APM College of Business and Communication - APM was established over 25 years ago and offers business degrees and vocational diplomas, and the opportunity to pathway into a master's degree.
 Billy Blue College of Design - Billy Blue College was created by designers for designers, offering appropriate courses for aspiring design professionals. The college started off as a magazine and later moved into a design agency. It then went on to develop into a school and now finally, a university.
 Chifley Business School - For over two decades, Chifley has provided business education across Australia and internationally through a range of postgraduate courses for those looking to pursue careers in resources, engineering, and information technology.
 Media Design School - Media Design School was founded to provide trained graduates for digital and technological companies.
 Real Madrid Graduate School (Universidad Europea) - The Real Madrid Graduate School was launched in 2006 to train in all disciplines related to sport.
 Blue Mountains International Hotel Management School (or BMIHMS) - was opened in 1991 and focuses on hotel management education. It is number 1 in Oceania by subject 2019 according to QS World University rankings Hospitality and Leisure Management, and number 1 Hotel Management School in Australia and Asia-Pacific's in 2020 according to Kantar.
 Torrens University Language Centre (TULC) - The Torrens University Language Centre has been delivering English language programs in Australia for more than 20 years. Founded in 1995, the centre offers academic and general English courses to students from around the world.
 William Blue College of Hospitality Management - private hospitality college offering bachelor's degrees, associate degrees and diploma courses that specialise in tourism and hospitality management including work placement with industry partners.

Research institutes and centres

 The Centre of Artificial Intelligence Research and Optimisation (AIRO) focuses on cutting-edge research in two ground-breaking areas of science in the current century: Artificial Intelligence and Optimisation.
 The Centre for Organisational Change and Agility (COCA) spans research topics from accounting, finance, global project management, global supply and value, leadership, business systems, commercial services, tourism, strategy, management and organisational behaviour.
 The Centre for Healthy Futures (CHEF) aims for the prevention and treatment of chronic diseases and the improvement of individual wellbeing. Through research on environmental, lifestyle and economic factors that impact health and quality of life, and with a particular focus on health and wellbeing throughout the lifespan, this research also contributes to better understanding healthcare systems and developing technology for both individual and whole of population health.
 Centre for Public Health, Equity and Human Flourishing (PHEFH) conducts transdisciplinary research to tackle complex and critical public health issues of our time. 
 Public Health Information Development Unit (PHIDU) – Since its establishment with funding from the Australian Government in 1999, the PHIDU has been committed to providing information on a broad range of health and other determinants across the lifespan. Located at Torrens University Australia since November 2015, the emphasis continues to be on the publication of small area statistics. Since 2008, PHIDU has offered free online access to a range of data for researchers to reference.

Initiatives

Voices for Social Change: Torrens University Australia released a massively popular free online short course on social entrepreneurship in collaboration with International Youth Foundation, B Lab and Laureate International Universities in March 2020. To date over 31,500 people have completed the Voices of Social Change course globally, which is offered in Spanish, English and Portuguese. The five-week Massive Open Online Course (MOOC) was co-designed and facilitated by eight experienced social entrepreneurs from different corners of the globe including Australia, Brazil, Mexico, Chile and the United States.  

On 2 April 2018, Torrens University Australia launched a free online course called "the Voices of Autism" to celebrate World Autism Awareness Day.

Free short courses in the pandemic: During COVID, industry led short courses were delivered free to the public (27,500 short courses completed, $3.8 million worth of free learning) – as many sought assistance to build skills at a time of job and career uncertainty. 

MOOC addressing well-being: Partnership with Beyond Blue in the height of the COVID lockdowns in 2020 on a Massive Online Open Course (MOOC) called Understanding Depression 3k+ participants from 60+ countries. 

In July 2021, Torrens University Australia launched another free online course, the Thin Ice VR short course. Co-designed by environmental scientist Tim Jarvis AM and lecturer James Calvert, it goes behind the scenes of the "Thin Ice" virtual reality production to teach about the creative technologies used to recreate Antarctic locations in realistic 3D. In 2022, Thin Ice VR won several awards, including Best Virtual Reality Short at the Cannes World Film Festival. 

On 25 January 2022, Torrens University Australia launched a 9-part podcast series featuring researchers from Torrens University, who are working towards solving complex global problems and propelling innovation. The podcast was recorded across Australia and New Zealand.

In February 2022, Torrens University launched the Sport for Good free online course that has been developed in collaboration with Australian soccer player and human rights activist Craig Foster. It teaches how to facilitate and support the sporting industry's role in promoting global good. It is delivered in four parts, each designed to emphasise the increased focus of the industry on a certain aspect of social responsibility.

Rankings

 #1 fastest growing university in Australia, according to Australian Government Department of Education higher education enrolment data

 Top 10 for teaching quality
 Top 10 for education experience
 Global Online MBA Rankings (CEO Magazine25) Tier One status three years in a row   
 Recognised as one of Australia's Most Innovative Companies three years in a row (2020 and 2021) (AFR)  
 BMIHMS in Suzhou named the Most Respected Hotel School of China 2021  
 Recognised by CEOWORLD Magazine as one of the top universities in Australia to study Software Engineering in 2021.  
 Ranked 2nd in overall employment for undergraduate international graduates in Australia
 Ranked 4th in full time employment for undergraduate international graduates 
 Postgraduates earn a salary within the top 20% in Australia.
 Media Design School ranked #1 in New Zealand and #2 in Australasia, with Billy Blue at #7 in Animation Career Review's 2020 Global College Ranking.  
 Media Design School ranked #1 Creative Tech School in the Southern Hemisphere – The Rookies 2021
 Ranked in of the Top 12 Animation School in the world – Animation Career Review 2021

Awards and accolades 

 2022 ASCILITE Award for Innovation - virtual design studio 
 Professor Seyedali Mirjalili named The Australian Research 2023 Magazine’s number 1 artificial intelligence researcher in the world 
 2022 Catalyst Award in the Teaching and Learning category - virtual design studio
 Linda Brown, Torrens University CEO and President | EY Entrepreneur of the Year™ Australia 2021

 AFR Boss most innovative company list 3 years in a row (2020, 2021, 2022) 
 Career Crush – winner of Mumbrella Award 2021 (Best User Experience)   
 BMIHMS – No. 1 hotel management school in Australia and Asia-Pacific (Kantar 2020)  
 MBA ranked by CEO Magazine as a Tier 1 MBA for 3 years in a row (2022)

Notable people

Vice-chancellors
 Alwyn Louw (2020–present)
Justin Beilby (2015–2019)
Fred McDougall (2012–2015)

Chancellors
 Jim Varghese AM (2022–present)
 Michael Mann AM (2012–2021)

President
 Linda Brown (2014–present)

Notable staff 

 Darren Peters
 Victoria Pendergast

Notable Faculty 

 Craig Foster
 Stephanie Kelton
 Sedeyali (Ali) Mirjalili
 Andy Blood

Notable alumni 

 Golgol Mebrahtu
 Alex Wilkinson
 Jonathon Giles   
 Oscar McInerney
 Paul Seedsman
 Hana Lowry
 Daniel Menzel
 Mackenzie Arnold
 Caitlin Foord
 Reilly O’Brien
 Leah Kaslar
 Casey Grice 
 Adam Vonthehoff 
 Matthew Duldig 
 Brent Reilley 
 John Haly 
 William Thomson
 Jake Pettit-Young

Blue Mountains International Hotel Management School (BMIHMS) 

Scott Boyes
 Tish Nyar
 Jack Widagdo

See also

APM College of Business and Communication
Billy Blue College of Design
Blue Mountains International Hotel Management School
Chifley Business School
Jansen Newman Institute
Media Design School
Southern School of Natural Therapies 
William Blue College of Hospitality Management
List of universities in Australia

References 

Educational institutions established in 2012
2012 establishments in Australia
Universities in Australia
Universities in Sydney
Universities in Melbourne
Universities in Brisbane
Universities in Victoria (Australia)
Universities in New South Wales
Universities in Queensland
Universities in South Australia